Hasselfelde is a town in the district of Harz, in Saxony-Anhalt, Germany. It is situated in the eastern Harz, approximately 17 km south of Wernigerode. Since 1 January 2010, it is part of the town Oberharz am Brocken.  Hasselfelde has 2,390 inhabitants.

Transport
The town has a railway station on the Selke Valley Railway, part of the Harz Narrow Gauge Railways (HSB).

Sights

Harz charcoal burning museum 

Along the road leading to Blankenburg is the Harzköhlerei Stemberghaus. This is an open-air museum that produces charcoal in the traditional way. The site includes a restaurant, the Köhlerhütte, built in 2012, and a souvenir shop. The museum is checkpoint 60 in the Harzer Wandernadel hiking network.

Memorial Stone on the Town Square 
A memorial stone dedicated "to those who suffered and lost their lives in wars and under terror and violence" is located in the northwest corner of the central town square. During socialist rule in East Germany, this stone had a much larger plaque stating "We Want Peace," which in 1993 was replaced by the present one. Judging by the number of holes drilled in the stone, and by their location, it is apparent that this same stone has had more uses in the past.

Personalities
Hermann Blumenau was born in Hasselfelde.
Andreas Werckmeister, was organist and music theorist in Hasselfelde from 1664 to 1674.

See also

References

Former municipalities in Saxony-Anhalt
Oberharz am Brocken
Towns in the Harz
Duchy of Brunswick